Eric Freedman is an American journalist and Knight Center for Environmental Journalism Chair and Professor at Michigan State University. He is a winner of Pulitzer Prize for Beat Reporting.

References

Living people
American male journalists
Michigan State University faculty
Cornell University alumni
New York University alumni
Year of birth missing (living people)